Dendropanax is a genus of flowering plants in the family Araliaceae, consisting of 92 species of evergreen trees and shrubs, first described by Joseph Decaisne & Jules Émile Planchon in 1854. They are native to Central and South America, eastern Asia and the Malay Peninsula. Species such as Dendropanax trifidus or "kakuremino" in Japanese, are used in roji gardens, traditional moist and mossy areas leading to the chashitsu for tea ceremonies.

References

Araliaceae
Apiales genera
Taxa named by Joseph Decaisne
Taxa named by Jules Émile Planchon